Erika Keresztesi (born 6 September 1987) is a Hungarian Paralympic athlete who competes in sprinting and middle-distance running events at international track and field competitions. She is a European silver medalist in the 400m T20, she also competed at the 2016 Summer Paralympics where she finished seventh place in the 400m T20.

References

1987 births
Living people
People from Vác
Hungarian female sprinters
Hungarian female middle-distance runners
Paralympic athletes of Hungary
Athletes (track and field) at the 2016 Summer Paralympics
Medalists at the World Para Athletics European Championships